Minoo Sharifi (born December 12, 1987) is an Iranian actress. She is best known for her performances in Walnut Tree (2020) and Lunar Eclipse (2021–2022). Sharifi earned a Crystal Simorgh nomination for her performance in Walnut Tree.

Career 
Sharifi entered the field of acting with the short film Pale Mirrors in 2015 and won the Jury Prize of the Koomesh Regional Festival and was nominated for Best Actress at the 33rd Tehran International Short Film Festival Awards.

In 2020, She got her first main role in Walnut Tree directed by Mohammad Hossein Mahdavian. she received a nomination for a Crystal Simorgh for Best Supporting Actress at the 38th Fajr Film Festival for her role.

Filmography

Film

Web

Awards and nominations

References

External links 

 

Iranian film actresses
Iranian actresses
1987 births
Living people
People from Sanandaj
People from Kurdistan Province
Kurdish people